Paolo Zanetti (born 16 December 1982) is an Italian football coach and a former player who is the head coach of Serie A club Empoli. As a player he played as a midfielder.

Club career
Zanetti started his career at native club Vicenza.

Empoli
Zanetti was sold to Empoli in a co-ownership deal in July 2003, for €671,400 fee (about 1.3 billion lire).

In his first season with Empoli, he just made 13 appearances in Serie A. However, Empoli was relegated to Serie B at the end of the season and Zanetti followed the club.

Zanetti played 30 games in the 2004–05 Serie B season, helping the club to win promotion back to Serie A. However, he just made nine appearances for the club in Serie A in the following season. In June 2006 Empoli signed him outright from Vicenza, for an additional €125,000 fee, making Empoli had paid Vicenza €796,400 in total.

Ascoli
After acquiring the remaining 50% registration rights from Vicenza in June 2006 for an additional €125,000 transfer fee, Empoli sold Zanetti to Ascoli in another co-ownership deal for €400,000 transfer fee in July.

Torino
In May 2007, Zanetti said he would stay on at Ascoli, despite them being relegated to the Serie B. Ascoli bought the full registration rights of the player for an additional €750,000 fee, (making Ascoli had paid €1.15 million transfer fee in total) but sent Zanetti, along with Saša Bjelanović, to Torino in another co-ownership deals for €1 million fee each, in a five-year and three-year contract respectively. In the mid of same season Torino bought him outright for an additional €500,000 (making Torino had paid Ascoli €1.5 million transfer fee for Zanetti in total) and Bjelanović was also bought by Torino for an additional €60,000 in June 2008.

During 2009–10 season, ultras of Torino attacked the players during David Di Michele's birthday party. After the incident the players involved: Di Michele, Massimo Loviso, Riccardo Colombo, Aimo Diana, Marco Pisano, Francesco Pratali, Zanetti were transferred to other clubs and only Rolando Bianchi, Matteo Rubin and Angelo Ogbonna were remained.

On 19 January 2010, Atalanta B.C. signed him on loan from Serie B club Torino F.C. until the end of the season.

Grosseto
After inactive from football for a season, Zanetti joined U.S. Grosseto F.C. on 8 August 2011 in a one-year deal. Torino and Zanetti terminated the contract between the two parties in a mutual consent.

Sorrento
In January 2012 he was signed by Sorrento Calcio. In May 2012 he signed a new two-year contract with Sorrento.

Reggiana
On 23 January 2013, he was signed by Reggiana. On 26 August 2013, he signed a new two-year contract. On 18 November 2014 Zanetti retired and became a backroom staff of the first team.

International career
Zanetti was a player of Azzurrini in 2001 UEFA European Under-18 Championship qualification He played twice. After the elimination of Italy from the competition, he also played for the U-19 team (de facto U-20 B) in two friendlies, against Netherlands (who still in the Euro U-19 competition) and Germany respectively in March and May 2001. In the 2001–02 season he played 13 times for the U-20 team, including matches in a four nations tournament. In the following season, he played once for the U-21 team in 2004 UEFA European Under-21 Championship qualification as well as 3 friendlies. In his only competitive appearance in the U-21 Euro, he was a substitute of Samuele Dalla Bona. He played his final appearance in national team against Austria on 19 August 2003, another friendly match.

Managerial career
After retiring, Zanetti stayed at Reggiana as a technical collaborator, and then as a youth coach.

In 2017, Zanetti took on his first head coaching job at Serie C club Südtirol. After two seasons ended with two consecutive promotion playoff appearances, on 7 June 2019 he left Südtirol for Serie B club Ascoli. He was sacked by Ascoli on 27 January 2020 following a 0–1 home loss to Frosinone that left the club to the bottom half of the Serie B league table.

On 27 May 2021, Zanetti secured Venezia's return to Serie A after a 2–1 aggregate win in the promotion play-off over Cittadella, thus ending their 19-year exile from the top flight. On 27 April 2022, Zanetti was sacked by the club following a run of eight straight defeats that saw Venezia bottom of the Serie A table.

On 6 June 2022, Serie A club Empoli, a former team of his as a player, announced to have hired Zanetti on a two-year deal as their new head coach.

Managerial Statistics

Notes

References

External links

 2005–06 Profile at La Gazzetta dello Sport 

Living people
1982 births
Sportspeople from the Province of Vicenza
Association football midfielders
Italian footballers
Italy under-21 international footballers
Italy youth international footballers
L.R. Vicenza players
Empoli F.C. players
Ascoli Calcio 1898 F.C. players
Torino F.C. players
Atalanta B.C. players
F.C. Grosseto S.S.D. players
A.S.D. Sorrento players
A.C. Reggiana 1919 players
Serie A players
Serie B players
Serie C players
Italian football managers
Ascoli Calcio 1898 F.C. managers
Venezia F.C. managers
Empoli F.C. managers
Serie A managers
Serie B managers
Serie C managers
Footballers from Veneto